Valeri Mikhailovich Malyshev (born 27 March 1980) is a former Russian professional football player.

Club career
He played in the Russian Football National League for FC Torpedo Vladimir in the 2011–12 season.

References

External links
 

1980 births
People from Vladimir, Russia
Living people
Russian footballers
Association football forwards
Association football midfielders
FC Tyumen players
FC Torpedo Vladimir players
Sportspeople from Vladimir Oblast